The Grandchamp House, at 1012 Preston Ave. in Thompson Falls in Sanders County, Montana, was built in 1911.  It has also been known as Wollaston House.  It was listed on the National Register of Historic Places in 1986.

It was deemed significant as "an intact example of a Bungalow style residence."  It was built by carpenter Nelson Grandchamp, who built three bungalows in Thompson Falls during 1910–12.

References

Houses on the National Register of Historic Places in Montana
Houses completed in 1911
National Register of Historic Places in Sanders County, Montana
1911 establishments in Montana
Bungalow architecture in Montana
Thompson Falls, Montana